The 2007 Men's EuroHockey Nations Challenge II was the second edition of the EuroHockey Nations Challenge II, the fourth level of the men's European field hockey championships organized by the European Hockey Federation. It was held from 9 to 15 September 2007 in Predanovci, Slovenia.

The hosts Slovenia won their first EuroHockey Nations Challenge II title and were promoted to EuroHockey Nations Challenge I.

Results
All times are local, CEST (UTC+1).

Preliminary round

Pool A

Pool B

Fifth to seventh place classification

Pool C
The points obtained in the preliminary round from the two teams in pool B against each other are taken over.

First to fourth place classification

Semi-finals

Third place game

Final

Final standings

 Promoted to the EuroHockey Nations Challenge I

See also
2007 Men's EuroHockey Nations Challenge I

References

EuroHockey Championship IV
Men 4
EuroHockey Nations Challenge II
EuroHockey Nations Challenge II
International field hockey competitions hosted by Slovenia